Fernando Rodríguez Ortega (born 11 May 1987) is a Spanish professional footballer who plays as a striker for Indonesian club Persis Solo.

Club career
Born in Pilas, Province of Seville, Rodríguez spent the vast majority of his career in the Spanish lower leagues. His professional input in his country consisted of two La Liga matches with Sevilla FC, as well as 16 in Segunda División with their reserves. He made his debut in the former competition on 19 October 2008, coming on as a late substitute for Lautaro Acosta in a 1–0 away win against UD Almería where he was also booked.

Rodríguez scored a career-best 18 goals in the 2013–14 season (adding two in the Copa del Rey) to help FC Cartagena qualify for the promotion play-offs in Segunda División B, where they eventually fell short. In 2016, with the club still in that league, he returned for a second spell.

In January 2017, the 29-year-old Rodríguez moved abroad for the first time, signing with Ceres–Negros F.C. of the Philippines Football League and being officially announced on the 17th. One year later, he switched to the Liga 1 (Indonesia) with Mitra Kukar FC.

On 28 November 2018, Rodríguez joined Malaysia Super League club Kedah FA. On 8 January 2020 he joined Johor Darul Ta'zim II FC, a reserve team who competed in the country's second tier.

Honours
Kedah
Malaysia FA Cup: 2019
Malaysia Cup runner-up: 2019

Johor Darul Ta'zim
Malaysia Super League: 2020
Malaysia Charity Shield: 2021

References

External links

1987 births
Living people
People from Aljarafe
Sportspeople from the Province of Seville
Spanish footballers
Footballers from Andalusia
Association football forwards
La Liga players
Segunda División players
Segunda División B players
Tercera División players
Sevilla FC C players
Sevilla Atlético players
Sevilla FC players
Ontinyent CF players
Real Jaén footballers
CD San Roque de Lepe footballers
AD Ceuta footballers
Lucena CF players
FC Cartagena footballers
Hércules CF players
CF Reus Deportiu players
Ceres–Negros F.C. players
Liga 1 (Indonesia) players
Mitra Kukar players
Persis Solo players
Malaysia Super League players
Kedah Darul Aman F.C. players
Johor Darul Ta'zim F.C. players
Spanish expatriate footballers
Expatriate footballers in the Philippines
Expatriate footballers in Indonesia
Expatriate footballers in Malaysia
Spanish expatriate sportspeople in the Philippines
Spanish expatriate sportspeople in Indonesia
Spanish expatriate sportspeople in Malaysia